Joseph Andrew Ross (born May 21, 1993) is an American professional baseball pitcher in the San Francisco Giants organization. He has played in Major League Baseball (MLB) for the Washington Nationals. The San Diego Padres selected Ross in the first round of the 2011 Major League Baseball draft (25th overall). In 2015 Ross made his major league debut.

Career

Minor leagues

San Diego Padres
The San Diego Padres selected Ross in the first round of the 2011 Major League Baseball draft (25th overall) out of Bishop O'Dowd High School in Oakland, California. He had committed to attend the University of California, Los Angeles, but signed with the Padres.

He made his professional debut for the Arizona League Padres. Prior to the 2012 season he was ranked by Baseball Prospectus as the 95th best prospect in baseball. In 2012, he pitched for the Fort Wayne TinCaps of the Class-A Midwest League but ended up missing most of the season on the disabled list with right shoulder inflammation after being unable to make a May 10 start against the South Bend Silver Hawks due to tightness.

Ross returned for the 2013 season in Fort Wayne.

He started the 2014 season with the Lake Elsinore Storm of the Class-A Advanced California League. He was promoted to Double-A during the season.

Washington Nationals
On December 19, 2014, the Padres traded Ross and a player to be named later, Trea Turner, to the Washington Nationals as part of a three-team trade, in which the Padres traded Jake Bauers, Burch Smith, and René Rivera to the Tampa Bay Rays, and Washington traded Steven Souza and Travis Ott to Tampa Bay.

On June 6, 2015, Ross was called up to the majors for the first time and he made his major league debut that day as a starting pitcher. Ross outdueled Jimmy Nelson and A. J. Burnett in his second and third starts, respectively, earning wins for the Washington Nationals. He struck out 11 batters in his third appearance, snapping an eight-game winning streak by the Pittsburgh Pirates. On August 6, manager Matt Williams announced Ross would remain in the rotation and veteran starter Doug Fister would move to the bullpen, in recognition of the rookie's strong performance since his promotion. Ross' promotion lasted barely a month before Williams said on September 8 that reliever Tanner Roark would take over his spot in the rotation and Ross would move to the bullpen in an effort to keep him from exceeding an undisclosed "innings limit" for the season.

Although Ross started the 2016 season in the Nationals' rotation, he lost much of the season due to right shoulder inflammation. He was placed on the disabled list on July 3, 2016, and was activated again on September 18. Upon returning from the disabled list, Ross struggled to pitch deep into games, more than once forming a tandem with rookie right-hander Reynaldo López to pitch the first few innings of a game before López took over in long relief. Ross started game 4 of the 2016 NLDS with the Nats up 2–1 in the series giving up 4 runs on 55 pitches in 2.2 innings.

Ross was an up-and-down contributor for the Nationals in the first half of the 2017 season. He started the year pitching for the Class-AAA Syracuse Chiefs, but after Nationals starter Jeremy Guthrie was shelled for 10 earned runs in less than an inning in what would be his only appearance of the season, Ross was called up. Upon struggling in the early going, he was optioned back to Syracuse on May 1 in favor of Jacob Turner. Ross returned to the major league rotation on May 23, pitching well against the Seattle Mariners. Through the first half of the season, Ross received more run support than any other pitcher in the major leagues, with the Nationals averaging more than 10 runs in games Ross started. Out of 13 starts by Ross at the major league level in 2017, the Nationals scored at least 10 runs in eight of them. However, in the last of these starts, against the Atlanta Braves on July 9, Ross exited in the fourth inning as the velocity of his fastball dipped so low into the mid-80s that the stadium radar gun was registering them as changeups. On July 15, 2017, medical tests confirmed that his elbow was diagnosed with a torn ulnar collateral ligament. It was further announced that he would undergo ulnar collateral ligament reconstruction ("Tommy John") surgery, ruling him out for the remainder of the season and at least part of the 2018 season. In 2017 he was 5–3 with a 5.01 ERA.

After recovering from his surgery, Ross attempted to make his first MLB start in 14 months on September 7, 2018, facing the Chicago Cubs on a rainy evening at Nationals Park. The game began after a 1-hour 21-minute delay, but the teams played for only 23 minutes before the game was stopped again with two outs in the top of the second inning and the score tied 0–0. Another 2-hour 54-minute delay ensued before the game was postponed. In his -inning outing, Ross threw 24 pitches, gave up one single and hit one batter, but retired the other five Cubs he faced, and his fastball was clocked consistently at 95–96 mph, occasionally reaching 97 mph, which was better than his pre-surgery velocity. In 2018 in three games he was 0–2 with a 5.06 ERA.

In 2019 he was 4–4 with a 5.48 ERA. Ross started game 5 of the 2019 World Series for the Nationals in place of Max Scherzer, who was dealing with a back injury. He allowed 4 runs in 5 innings and was credited with the loss as the Astros won 7–1. Ross received a World Series ring for his efforts after the Nationals defeated the Astros in 7 games.

On June 29, 2020, Ross announced he would not play in the shortened 2020 season during the COVID-19 pandemic.

On August 17, 2021, Ross was placed on the injured list after suffering a partial tear of his ulnar collateral ligament in his right elbow. On May 31, 2022, it was announced that Ross would require Tommy John surgery, ending his 2022 season.

San Francisco Giants
On January 30, 2023, Ross signed a minor league contract with the San Francisco Giants organization.

Personal life
Ross has an older brother, Tyson Ross, who pitched in MLB from 2010 to 2019. His father is a pediatrician and his mother an emergency room nurse in Oakland.  His sister, Frankie, is a pediatrician and played soccer at Portland State University.

References

External links

1993 births
Living people
Baseball players from Berkeley, California
African-American baseball players
Major League Baseball pitchers
Washington Nationals players
Arizona League Padres players
Fort Wayne TinCaps players
Eugene Emeralds players
Lake Elsinore Storm players
San Antonio Missions players
Harrisburg Senators players
Syracuse Chiefs players
21st-century African-American sportspeople
American baseball players of Korean descent